Michael Gary Allen (born May 20, 1935) is a former American cyclist. He competed in the team time trial at the 1964 Summer Olympics.

References

1935 births
Living people
American male cyclists
Olympic cyclists of the United States
Cyclists from Los Angeles
Cyclists at the 1964 Summer Olympics